This is a list of works by composer and pianist Juan María Solare.

 Ligia Lieder (1993–94)
 Arriba los de abajo 
 Black Bart
 Diez Estudios Escénicos
 Epiclesis
 FAQ (Frequently Asked Questions)
 Gestenstücke
 Panther
 Pasaje Seaver
 Passacaglia über Heidelberg
 Point of No Return
 Pope
 Schwächen
 Seis bagatelas
 Solidità della nebbia
 Two Still Lives in Free Fall
 Veinticinco de agosto, 1983
 Zugzwang

References

External links
 "Juan María Solare" Works Catalogue, page 63 from University of Bremen
 60x60 (2003) Concert Program
 Capstone Records 60x60 (2003) CD
 60x60 (2003) Concert Program

 
Solare, Juan Maria